Hans Caninenberg (1913–2008) was a German actor. He was married to the actress Lola Müthel.

Filmography

References

Bibliography
 Goble, Alan. The Complete Index to Literary Sources in Film. Walter de Gruyter, 1999.

External links

1913 births
2008 deaths
German male stage actors
German male television actors
German male film actors
20th-century German male actors